Gymnopilus josserandii is a species of mushroom in the family Hymenogastraceae.

See also

List of Gymnopilus species

External links
Gymnopilus josserandii at Index Fungorum

josserandii
Fungi of North America